Teldenia argeta is a moth in the family Drepanidae. It was described by Wilkinson in 1967. It is found in the Philippines and possibly also on Buru.

References

Moths described in 1967
Drepaninae
Moths of the Philippines